The McCanna–Hubbell Building, also known as the AG&E Building, is a historic commercial building in downtown Albuquerque, New Mexico. Built in 1915, it is a two-story brick structure with a prominent cornice. From 1917 to the mid-1960s the building was the headquarters of the Albuquerque Gas & Electric Company, which later became the Public Service Company of New Mexico (PNM). During this period the piers and cornice of the building were decorated with hundreds of electric light bulbs, the sockets for which are still in place. PNM later moved two blocks south to the PNM Building on Silver Avenue.

The property was added to the New Mexico State Register of Cultural Properties in 1981 and the National Register of Historic Places in 1982. It is located on the southeast corner of 5th Street and Central Avenue, adjacent to the S. H. Kress Building and directly across the street from the KiMo Theater.

References

Office buildings in Albuquerque, New Mexico
Commercial buildings on the National Register of Historic Places in New Mexico
Commercial buildings completed in 1915
Buildings and structures on U.S. Route 66
New Mexico State Register of Cultural Properties
National Register of Historic Places in Albuquerque, New Mexico